Boris Maksimovich Gurevich (23 March 1931 – 10 January 1995) was a flyweight Greco-Roman wrestler from the Soviet Union. He won gold medals at the 1952 Olympics, the 1953 world championships, and the 1958 world championships.

Gurevich first trained in gymnastics and later took up wrestling in 1948. He won the Soviet wrestling titles in 1950 and 1955, placed second in 1952, 1959, and 1960, and placed third in 1963. After retiring from competitions he coached wrestlers in Moscow, where an annual international wrestling tournament has been held in his honor since 1996.

References

External links
 

1931 births
1995 deaths
Olympic wrestlers of the Soviet Union
Wrestlers at the 1952 Summer Olympics
Soviet male sport wrestlers
Olympic gold medalists for the Soviet Union
Sportspeople from Moscow
Olympic medalists in wrestling
Soviet Jews
Jewish wrestlers
Medalists at the 1952 Summer Olympics
World Wrestling Championships medalists
Russian State University of Physical Education, Sport, Youth and Tourism alumni